Arthur Potts (26 May 1888 – January 1981) was an English professional footballer who played as an inside forward in the Football League for Wolverhampton Wanderers, Manchester United and Walsall.

Personal life 
Potts served in the Manchester Regiment during the First World War. He later became a publican and ran the Blue Ball pub on Pipers Row, Wolverhampton.

Career statistics

References

External links
Profile at MUFCInfo.com

1888 births
1981 deaths
English footballers
Willenhall F.C. players
Manchester United F.C. players
Wolverhampton Wanderers F.C. players
People from Cannock Chase District
English Football League players
Hednesford Town F.C. players
Walsall F.C. players
Dudley Town F.C. players
British Army personnel of World War I
Manchester Regiment soldiers
Association football inside forwards
Southport F.C. wartime guest players
FA Cup Final players